Minuscule 355 (in the Gregory-Aland numbering), ε 235 (Soden), is a Greek minuscule manuscript of the New Testament, on parchment. Paleographically it has been assigned to the 12th century.

The manuscript has complex contents and some marginalia.

Description 

The codex contains a complete text of the four Gospels on 410 parchment leaves, in octavo (8 leaves in quire), with a Commentary of Theophylact. The text is written in one column per page, in 18 lines per page.

There is also another division according to the smaller Ammonian Sections, with references to the Eusebian Canons.

Text 

The Greek text of the codex is a representative of the Byzantine text-type. Hermann von Soden classified it to the textual family K1. Aland placed it in Category V.
According to the Claremont Profile Method it represents family Kx in Luke 1, Luke 10, and Luke 20.

History 

The manuscript was added to the list of New Testament manuscripts by Scholz (1794-1852).
It was examined by Birch, Burgon. C. R. Gregory saw it in 1886.

The manuscript is currently housed at the Biblioteca Marciana (Gr. Z. 541) in Venice.

See also 
 List of New Testament minuscules
 Biblical manuscript
 Textual criticism
 Minuscule 212

References

Further reading 
 

Greek New Testament minuscules
12th-century biblical manuscripts